GVCS may refer to:
 General Catalogue of Variable Stars, a list of variable stars
 Global Vision Christian School, a private school in South Korea
 Global Village Construction Set, an Open Source Ecology project
 Gardena Valley Christian School, a K-8th grade private school, providing Christian education to the children of southern California's South Bay area in Los Angeles.
Green Valley Christian School
 Global Value Chain, a value chain analytical approach in Development Studies